Not to be confused with David Henry Smith (economics author) or David Andrew Smith. For other uses, see David Smith (disambiguation).

David Richard Smith is the Washington DC bureau chief of The Guardian. From 2010 to 2015 Smith was the Africa correspondent for The Guardian for which he was based in Johannesburg, South Africa.

Personal life
Smith is a graduate of the University of Leeds. Smith married American actress Andrea Harris, a grand-daughter of historically influential African American psychologists and educators Kenneth and Mamie Clark, at the Loeb Boathouse in Central Park, Manhattan, New York City on 18 September 2010.

References

External links
 David Smith's profile and latest articles at The Guardian
  David Smith's letter from Africa at The Guardian
 David Smith @SmithInAmerica on Twitter
 His wife Andrea Harris at IMDB

Living people
Year of birth missing (living people)